World government is the concept of a single political body that would make, interpret and enforce international law.

World government may also refer to:

World government (Mormonism), a prophecy in Mormon theology
World Government (One Piece), the fictional world of One Piece
World Government Party, a minor federalist political party in the United Kingdom

See also
Cosmopolitanism
Democratic World Federalists
Global governance
International Court of Justice
League of Nations
New World Order (conspiracy theory)
On World Government 
Salomon Smith Barney World Government Bond Index 
United Nations
World Federalist Movement
World government in science fiction
World state in Brave New World